A Pair of Cupids, also known by its pre-release title of Both Members, is a 1918 American silent comedy-drama film, directed by Charles Brabin. It stars Francis X. Bushman, Beverly Bayne, and Charles Sutton, and was released on July 29, 1918.

Cast list
 Francis X. Bushman as Peter Warburton
 Beverly Bayne as Virginia Parke
 Charles Sutton as Henry Burgess
 Gerald Griffin as Michael McGroghan
 Jessie Stevens as Bridget McGroghan
 Edgar Norton as Martin
 Lou Gorey as Marie
 Mrs. Turner as Lizette
 Thomas Blake as Bat Small
 Louis Wolheim as Dirk Thomas
 John Judge as John Henry McGroghan
 Elwell Judge as Mary Ann McGroghan

References

External links 
 
 
 

Films directed by Charles Brabin
Metro Pictures films
American silent feature films
American black-and-white films
1918 comedy-drama films
1918 films
1910s English-language films
1910s American films
Silent American comedy-drama films